Edwin Orlando Díaz Laboy (born March 22, 1994) is a Puerto Rican professional baseball pitcher for the New York Mets of Major League Baseball (MLB). He previously played for the Seattle Mariners.

Within two months of his MLB debut, Díaz broke the Mariners' record for consecutive strikeouts and was named the team's closer.  After saving 19 games, he finished fifth in the American League (AL) Rookie of the Year voting.  In 2018, he recorded 57 saves to lead the American League, was an All-Star, and was named AL Reliever of the Year. The Mariners traded him to the Mets after the season, where he earned his second All-Star honor during the 2022 season.

Early life 
Díaz grew up in the Naguabo neighborhood in Naguabo, Puerto Rico. He started playing baseball around age 7, playing mostly as a center fielder. While growing up in Puerto Rico, Díaz played as an outfielder during his youth along players like Carlos Correa and José Berríos. At the insistence of his father, he reluctantly tried pitching as a teenager.

Professional career

Minor leagues (2012–2016)
The Seattle Mariners selected Díaz in the third round, with the 98th overall pick, of the 2012 Major League Baseball draft out of Caguas Military Academy in Caguas, Puerto Rico. He made his professional debut that season for the Arizona League Mariners. In nine games (one start) he went 2–1 with a 5.21 earned run average (ERA) with 20 strikeouts in 19 innings. In 2013, he pitched for the Pulaski Mariners. In 13 starts, he went 5–2 with a 1.43 ERA and 79 strikeouts over 69 innings. Prior to the 2014 season, Díaz was named the Mariners fifth best prospect by Baseball America. He spent the season with the Clinton LumberKings and was co-selected the organization's minor league Starting Pitcher of the Year along Jordan Pries.

In 2015, Díaz played for the Bakersfield Blaze and Jackson Generals. That year, he won the recognition of minor league Starting Pitcher of the Year for the second consecutive season. Díaz started 2016 with Jackson as a starting pitcher and was moved to the bullpen after six starts.

Seattle Mariners

2016

Díaz was called up to the major leagues for the first time on June 4, 2016. Between June 28 and July 3, he recorded ten consecutive outs via strikeout, tying a franchise record set in 1997. On July 6, 2016, Díaz broke the record with his 11th consecutive out via strikeout. Between July 19 and 22, 2016, he recorded 8 consecutive strikeouts, tying him for second place with four different American League pitchers (Doug Fister set the AL record, with 9, on September 27, 2012).

On August 1, 2016, Díaz replaced Steve Cishek as the Mariners' closer. He recorded the first save of his career the following day, in a 5–4 win over the Boston Red Sox, in which he struck out the side. By reaching his 50th strikeout in only 25 and a third innings, Díaz became the first pitcher to do so in at least 123 years.

2018: All-Star season 
Owning a 2.25 ERA, 36 saves, and 76 strikeouts in 48 innings, Díaz was named to the 2018 All-Star Game, his first All-Star appearance. Díaz became the holder of the Seattle Mariners Club Record for saves before the All-Star Break, finishing with 36 saves before the break. The previous club record was 29 saves by Kazuhiro Sasaki in the 2001 season. In the All-Star Game, Díaz was the winning pitcher even though he also had a blown save in the process as the NL team tied the game in the 9th inning. He ended up with two strikeouts and two earned runs including a home run in one inning pitched. Díaz received the AL Reliever of the Month Award for April, June, and July. On August 10, Díaz recorded his 44th save, thus breaking the record for most saves by a Puerto Rican MLB player. Roberto Hernández had 43 in 1999.

With a win on August 12 against the Houston Astros, the Mariners were 26–0 when Díaz was handed a one-run lead. In those games Díaz had 24 saves, a 0.68 ERA, 26.1 IP, 13 H, 2 ER, 5 BB, and 49 strikeouts. Also, with the save on August 12 (his 46th of the season), Díaz became the first pitcher to record four saves in a single series since 2004 as Seattle completed a four-game sweep of the Astros.  Díaz's 24 saves when entering a game with a one-run lead broke the record for most in a season, which had been 23, set by Francisco Rodríguez for the Angels of Anaheim in 2008. His save number 46 of the season was part of 27 straight saves; he had a 0.39 ERA in games that he had saved in the 2018 season. On August 24, Díaz notched his 49th save of the season, setting a Mariners single-season record when he closed out a 6–3 win over the Arizona Diamondbacks. The previous Mariners franchise single-season saves record was 48, by Fernando Rodney in the 2014 season. On August 25, 2018, Díaz became the youngest pitcher to collect 50 saves in a season when he closed a 4–3 victory over the Arizona Diamondbacks. The 50 saves meant that Seattle manager Scott Servais had to follow through on a bet and get a haircut like that of Díaz. Díaz, who usually keeps the ball after each of his saves, gave Saturday's to Servais in honor of the bet.

On October 27, Díaz was awarded the AL Reliever of the Year award. He finished the 2018 season with 57 saves (leading the major leagues) and 65 games finished to go with a 1.96 ERA, 124 strikeouts, and a 0.79 WHIP in  innings. His 57 saves tied with Bobby Thigpen for the second-highest single-season saves total of all time.

New York Mets

On December 3, 2018, the Mariners traded Díaz, Robinson Canó, and $20 million to the New York Mets for Jay Bruce, Jarred Kelenic, Anthony Swarzak, Gerson Bautista, and Justin Dunn. He recorded his first save as a Met on Opening Day against the Washington Nationals.

In the first half of the 2019 season, Díaz surrendered more than twice as many hits per nine innings as in the 2018 season and his ERA+ dropped from 210 in 2018 to 74 in the first half of the 2019 campaign. Writing for Deadspin, David Roth described Díaz's downturn as "arguably the most dramatic and most surprising" of any player's collapse to that point in the 2019 MLB season.

On September 26, 2019, Díaz allowed his 15th ninth-inning home run of the season, the most 9th innings home runs given up by a single pitcher in a single season in Major League history. He finished the season with 58 innings pitched, 26 saves, and an ERA of 5.59.

In the pandemic-shortened 2020 season, Díaz converted six of ten save opportunities and recorded a 1.75 ERA with 50 strikeouts and 14 walks in  innings.

On April 29, 2022, Díaz pitched in relief in a combined no-hitter against the Philadelphia Phillies, pitching the final inning and earning the save.  On June 12, he struck out five batters.  Díaz earned NL Reliever of the Month honors in June, allowing one run in  innings, converting all five save opportunities and allowing a 0.93 WHIP.

On July 10, 2022, Díaz was named an All-Star for the second time in his career. He entered the All-Star break with 20 saves in 23 save opportunities and a 1.69 ERA. He struck out 75 of the 145 batters he faced in the first half of the season.  Díaz closed out the ninth inning of a 1–0 win versus Philadelphia on August 13 to earn his 200th career save, the sixth active player to do so.  He issued two walks during that outing, ending a streak of 50 batters faced without a walk.

On November 9, 2022, Díaz signed a 5-year contract with the Mets worth $102 million, the most valuable contract ever signed by a relief pitcher. On December 6, 2022, Díaz was named the 2022 Trevor Hoffman National League Reliever of the Year. He also made the All-MLB First Team.

On March 15, 2023, after striking out the side in the ninth inning against the Dominican Republic, sending Puerto Rico to the World Baseball Classic quarterfinals, Díaz suffered an injury to his right knee during the celebration and had to be helped off the field. On March 16, the Mets announced Díaz would undergo surgery to repair a full-thickness tear of his patellar tendon and would miss roughly 8 months in recovery.

International career 
Díaz played as a relief pitcher, more specifically as a closer for the Puerto Rican national team in the 2017 World Baseball Classic (WBC) where he won a silver medal. He had 2 saves at the tournament: one against Dominican Republic and another against United States, both in the second round. In the semifinal game against the Netherlands, he won the game as Puerto Rico scored in the bottom of the 11th inning for a 4–3 win.

During the 2023 WBC, Díaz pitched the seventh inning of an ongoing perfect game versus Israel, which ended by a 10–0 score on a walk-off hit in the bottom of the eighth inning that invoked the tournament's mercy rule.  However, it did not qualify as an official perfect game per the Elias Sports Bureau, due to lasting fewer than nine innings. Díaz also closed the final pool play game against the Dominican Republic, sending Puerto Rico to the quarterfinals. However, immediately after the game, he suffered an injury to his right knee during the celebration that ended his participation in the tournament. Puerto Rico would be eliminated in their following game against Mexico. For the tournament, Díaz pitched to a perfect 0.00 ERA with four strikeouts over two innings of work.

Pitching style 
Díaz throws three pitches. His most common pitch is a hard four-seam fastball that has averaged  in his first three seasons in MLB.

Díaz has been a strikeout pitcher in his MLB career, compiling an average of 14.4 strikeouts per nine innings pitched through the 2021 season.

Díaz is known for his entrance music being "Narco" by Blasterjaxx and Timmy Trumpet.

Personal life

In the offseason, Díaz spends time in his native Daguao in the Naguabo Municipality in Puerto Rico, where most of his family lives.

Díaz has organized baseball clinics for the children in his hometown as part of his Edwin Díaz Baseball Academy. Robinson Canó and Martín Maldonado have attended these clinics.

Díaz's brother, Alexis Díaz, is a professional baseball player who currently pitches for the Cincinnati Reds. Alexis' first save, on May 17, 2022, made them the third set of brothers to both earn a save on one day.

See also 

 Baseball in Puerto Rico
 List of Major League Baseball career saves leaders
 List of Major League Baseball no-hitters
 List of Major League Baseball players from Puerto Rico
 List of New York Mets no-hitters
 List of Puerto Ricans
 List of Seattle Mariners team records
 Most Saves in a single season
 New York Mets award winners and league leaders
 Seattle Mariners award winners and league leaders

References

External links

Edwin Díaz recent news - Rotoworld.com

1994 births
Living people
Major League Baseball players from Puerto Rico
Major League Baseball pitchers
Seattle Mariners players
New York Mets players
National League All-Stars
Arizona League Mariners players
People from Naguabo, Puerto Rico
Pulaski Mariners players
Clinton LumberKings players
Bakersfield Blaze players
Jackson Generals (Southern League) players
American League All-Stars
American League saves champions
2017 World Baseball Classic players
2023 World Baseball Classic players